is a Japanese manga series written and illustrated by Etsushi Ogawa. It was serialized in Kodansha's Weekly Shōnen Magazine and Magazine Special from October 1995 to November 1996; a follow-up sequel, was serialized in Weekly Shōnen Magazine from January 1997 to May 1999. Both series' overall chapters were collected in seventeen tankōbon volumes. The story is centered on Liu Mao Xing, a boy whose aim is to become the best chef he could be.

An anime television series adaptation by Nippon Animation aired on Fuji TV from April 1997 to September 1998. In some other countries, the anime adaptation was also called Cooking Master Boy.

In November 2017, Ogawa started a sequel entitled Chūka Ichiban! Kiwami, published in Kodansha's Magazine Pocket app.

An anime television series adaptation of Shin Chūka Ichiban!, or True Cooking Master Boy, produced by NAS and Production I.G, aired from October to December 2019. A second season aired from January to March 2021.

Setting
The story takes place in 19th century China during the Qing dynasty, where the Emperor was weakened and the country was close to chaos. It is also during a fictitious era called "The Era of the Cooking Wars". It was an era in which top chefs with different cooking styles tried their best to improve their skills and to become the best chef in China. It is a country where insulting a high-grade chef or fooling around with cooking could land a person in a jail, and impersonating a top-chef is as bad as usurpation of authority. Chefs compete with each other in order to gain respect and even power, but also with the risks of losing everything.

In the manga, the country of China is divided into four major regions: Beijing, Sichuan, Shanghai, and Guangdong.

Story
After the death of Mao's mother, Pai, who was called the 'Goddess of Cuisine', Mao becomes a Super Chef in order to take the title as Master Chef of his mother's restaurant. However, before he takes his mother's place as Master Chef, he continues to travel China in order to learn more of the many ways of cooking, in the hopes of becoming a legendary chef, just like his mother. During his journey, he meets great friends and fierce rivals who wish to challenge him in the field of cooking.

Underground Cooking Society
The Underground Cooking Society, also called the Dark Cooking Society, is an organized group which aims to control all of China through the cooking field. Even though they already have a strong influence all over the country, they still search for all eight of the Legendary Cooking Utensils in order to gain absolute power. They do anything to win and exterminate those who get in their way. When they see a great chef who may become a threat to their master plan or if a chef beats one of them, they'll continue to send chefs to challenge that person until they lose. Their training is very strict, and cruel, and most trainees do not survive and often kidnap young children and forcibly disconnect them from their family through murder. To initiate a chef whose survived the training, they would sometimes scar that person's face and/or body. Once inducted into the organization, there is no turning back and trying to escape is suicidal. Those who fail a task for the organization meet with a terrible end.

Members of the Underground are branded with the mark of the organization. They also have powerful skills called the Dark Cooking Techniques, known only by members of the organization or those that they challenge. They are the most feared organization in all of China.

Legendary Cooking Utensils

In ancient times, a meteorite fell from the sky and was first found by Master Chef Shui Lei. Shui crafted eight cooking utensils from the meteorite. Not only were those eight high-class cooking tools, but they also had mystical effects on the food they were used on. The eight cooking utensils were so powerful that Master Chef Shui Lei had to store them in eight separate locations of China, so people would not have to fight over them.

The Legendary Cooking Utensils have immense power, whether they are being used by good or evil. If they are used by good, they can bring about great results that would make people happy. If they are used by evil, they can have destructive powers that could devastate all of China. Also, if a Legendary Cooking Utensil is used on something other than cooking (i.e. killing), its mystical powers would diminish.

Mentioned Legendary Cooking Utensils:
 Ever-Soul Knife
Stored within the Big Angelic Temple for several generations until Mao became the worthy successor. Not only Mao, but also Leon was found out to be worthy as well. Even though it was stored in a temple for so long, without anyone touching it, there was no sign of rust on the knife when it was brought out. When choosing its successor, the mark of a dragon would appear on the blade when it is held by the chosen chef. It has the ability to make every food it cuts, fresh, even if it has passed its expiration date. Unfortunately, after a failed attempt in stealing it, a member of the Underground, stabbed himself with it causing the knife to lose its abilities. After Mao's final battle against Fei, the knife regained its powers in order to save Fei.
 Coiled Dragon Pot
The first to be found by Mao and his group after going on their journey to find the Legendary Cooking Utensils. After putting together two pieces of a map, they figured out that it was hidden near the outskirts of Shanghai. Unlike the Ever-Soul Knife, the Coiled Dragon Pot was found in a place with no caretakers or even a temple. It was found inside a secret compartment behind a Kitchen God statue. At first, it seemed to be a rusted pot until Mao touched it. Being the chosen successor, Mao was able to turn it back into its original form. The Coiled Dragon Pot has the power to hasten the fermentation process to an amazing speed.
 Holy Copperware
Found in Jiu Hua Mountains. Originally it was dug up from the farmlands of Jiu Hua many years ago. Not knowing of the mystical powers, it possessed, the merchants decided to melt it down so it could turn into spare tools. However, before it could be melted down, a con artist, Wong Seiyo, bought it from them. Since he saved it from being melted down, the Holy Copper-ware decided to let him be able to use the mystical powers even though he was not a worthy successor. Using its powers, Seiyo decided to take advantage of the people of Jiu Hua by using the land's legends to make the people believe he was a god. When Mao arrived, he stopped Seiyo's scheme, made the people believe in their homeland again, and found another Legendary Cooking Utensil. The Holy Copper-ware has the power to instantly soften dried ingredients, such as dried abalone (which would usually take three or more days to do he win in the league).

Characters

Main characters


A 13-year-old boy. Mao basically grew up in the kitchen watching his mother cook in her restaurant. Due to this, he grew up learning his mother's cooking skills and also ended up with the same love for cooking his mother had. Although he had that kind of knowledge, Mao did not cook much, and everyone just thought of him as a kid who just played around and who did not even know how to cook. It was not until his mother's restaurant was in jeopardy that he decided to cook. To everyone's surprise, Mao was a genius chef. Seeing his talent, General Lee sends him on a journey to become a Super Chef. Eventually, Mao becomes the youngest Super Chef in history and decides to travel the country even more, so he can learn more about cooking techniques.
Even though he does not have much experience, Mao has the pride of a truly experienced chef and having learned from his mother that a chef's purpose is to create a dish that makes people happy, he always put his customers' needs first and is always able to make a creative dish that greatly satisfies them. Along with his curiosity in wanting to learn more about cooking, Mao also has unique taste buds; having the ability to remember every single food he has eaten and its ingredients, he could even identify or name all of the ingredients in the food he is currently eating. These traits make Mao a strong contender in the battlefield of cooking.


The 16-year-old daughter of Chouyu. Originally, she was a helper at the Yang Spring Restaurant. She fell in love with Mao after seeing how much he loves cooking and how he also cares about others. She only knows a little about the cooking field, but she is useful when it comes to little facts and often tries to help Mao with various other things. After finding out that Mao was leaving the Yang Spring Restaurant to travel China, she was heartbroken since she thought that she could live a life with him. She eventually made up her mind and decided to also leave the restaurant, in order to travel with him (In the manga, she did not accompany Mao in his journey around China). Mei often gets into arguments with Shirou and always ends up slapping or hitting him. She also gets very jealous every time another woman gets near Mao. An example of her animosity towards women that gets close to Mao is when his sister, Karin, visits him to bring their mother's cooking materials; she says that Karin will never be good for Mao, until she finds out that she is his sister. On another occasion, when the female chef, Anzu, finally realized the way of making singe cuisine, she kissed Mao as a sign of gratitude, but Mei Li became angry and began to express her anger by hitting Shirou. However, she says that her number one rival for Mao's heart is his love for cooking. She is a spitting image of her deceased mother, Meika.
Si Lang/

A 12-year-old mischievous travelling companion. His mother is Japanese, making him half Japanese and half Chinese. He first met Mei Li and Mao when they found him passed out, due to hunger, in the forest (In the manga, he bumped into Mao after stealing food from people). He left his village when he was 10 so he could fulfill his promise of becoming a Super Chef. Although he did not become one during his two-year travel, he pretended to be one when he returned to his village (which was moments before meeting Mao and Mei Li). He was soon found out when a cooking official said his Super Chef badge was fake. After finding out that Mao was a Super Chef, he made himself Mao's apprentice and decided to travel with him. He often teases Mei Li and constantly grabs her breasts, resulting in him being constantly hit by her. He may not be a cooking genius, but he knows more about cooking than Mei Li and is only somewhat average in cooking. Shirou often gets into trouble and also causes trouble for the other group members. He later becomes a chef-in-training at Yang Spring Restaurant.

A Dim Sum master from San Sei. He is also called "Steel Staff Xie". He is in his twenties and is considered to be the youngest Dim Sum Master. He always carries with him a heavy steel staff, which he uses as both a weapon and a cooking utensil. Several yellow stars are engraved on the end of the staff, signifying the number of Super Chefs he has defeated. After challenging Mao to a cooking battle, he engraved a black star on his staff because he had lost. He one day hopes to replace that black star with a yellow one.
Xie Lu is considered to be a nomad; he often encounters Mao and his friends during their travel. Starting at a young age, he has travelled around China in order to learn more about cooking. He has a very optimistic view on life and often scolds Shirou (he had a bad impression of Shirou ever since Shirou unknowingly made him a bad plate of food).
Xie Lu is very athletic and also happens to be good at math. He later travels with Mao and the others in search for the Legendary Cooking Utensils. His fookien name is Ji Long.
Lei En/

Leon initially introduced himself as a member of the Dark Cooking Society; he is known for using seafood as primary ingredients for his dishes and can prepare them to their utmost potential thanks to his superior knives and the skills to wield them. He first appeared at the Yang Spring Restaurant demanding that Ruoh give him one of the Legendary Cooking Utensils that he says he is entitled. Ruoh then said that he had to battle Mao in order to find out the utensil's true successor. The battle was won by Mao and Leon soon revealed everything to him after realizing that he still loves cooking, and like Mao, Leon is also the successor to the Ever-Soul knife. Leon revealed that he betrayed and escaped the Dark Cooking Society after realizing the kind of organization they are.
It turns out that a young Leon was a cook for the Yang Spring Restaurant a few years ago. Like Mao, Leon was a natural genius in the field of cooking, having learned and comprehended just about everything Chouryuu had to teach him in just one month. He was also a kind child; not wanting to kill animals, but when he does, he places a red paper talisman on the dead animal and prays for it. Since he wanted to learn more about cooking, he left the restaurant and ventured around China. During his travels, he began to grow a strong urge to become a better cook, but when he could not find anymore suitable things to learn, he decided to join the Dark Cooking Society in order to learn their Dark Cooking Techniques. While in the Underground, his knife skills evolved to an unreachable level. Corrupted by the organization, he became even more obsessed in becoming the best chef. He sought out Luo Xie, the best knife forger in China, and had him forge the best knives. Luo Xie called his creation the Seven-Star Knives, the best knife set in all of China. On a cliff top, when Luo Xie said that he will one day create a better set, Leon was enraged, and in a fit of anger, stabbed him in the abdomen, causing him to fall off. This traumatized Leon and began to make things right from that point. He is the only person who possesses the coveted Seven-Star knives. Although, on the episode "The True Owner of the Seven-Star Knives", he encounters an Underground female chef, Shan An, who possesses duplicates.
He travels with Mao retrieving the Legendary Cooking Utensils, in order to prevent the Dark Cooking Society from possessing them.

A 14-year-old chef from Shanghai who used to be a 4th level chef at Yang Spring Restaurant. Initially, he did not like Mao because he knew that Mao would eventually take his spot at the restaurant and then he would have to leave. He was not liked much in the restaurant since everyone thought that he was a lazy cook who did not even like cooking in the first place. It was not until Mao found him practicing his cooking skills, late at night, that Mao realized that he likes to cook. San Jie revealed to him that his father was a great chef, but he had extremely strict teaching methods. Due to the stress, Sanche ended up cutting his hand and instead of being worried, his father scolded him even more causing his mother to interfere. Since she interfered, she ended up getting the blame. Not being able to stand it anymore, San Jie ran away from home and started working in the Yang Spring Restaurant. He ended up getting a scar from when he cut his hand and he says that he has difficulty cutting ingredients because every time he sees his scar, he is reminded of all those terrible events. After talking San Jie into not giving up as a chef, they worked all night to come up with an idea that would convince Zhou Yu, the Vice Chef at Yang Spring, to not kick San Jie out of the restaurant. Though they succeeded in doing so, Sanche decided that he would go back home to make up with his father, since he still loves him, and to also take up his father's strict training again, so he can hone his skills even more.
When San Jie encountered Mao and his group in Shanghai, he was already a Head Chef at his father's restaurant and had greatly improved his cooking skills, especially his knife skills.

A handsome 16-year-old genius chef. Although he is considered to be a more knowledgeable chef than Mao, he is the one chef that could be considered as Mao's true rival in cooking. Unlike Mao, Fei is a calm and collected chef who can always do things in an organized manner. He was first introduced as one of Mao's opponents during the Super Chef tournament. Even though he was an opponent who seemed to have a cold personality, he helped Mao a few times during the competition. He, along with Mao, made history when they both passed the Super Chef test at the same time. It turned out that he knows about Mao's mother, and that he sees her as his savior.
When he was young, his entire family was killed by the Underground Cooking Society that also kidnapped him. He was brought to them and went through strict training in order to create perfect dishes and see who has the greatest potential to become a member of the Underground Cooking Society. He was forced to go through torturous training everyday or face death or torture. When he escaped, he passed out in front of Kikkaro Restaurant. Pai found him, treated his wounds, and fed him herbal soup that rejuvenated his body. Before meeting her, Fei thought of cooking as this horrible thing that caused him so much pain. When he met her, he realized that cooking was something where you create dishes that would make people happy. After learning from her he went to travel around China.
When Mao encountered Fei again, Fei was a chef working for the Dark Cooking Society and was about to become the Head Chef of the Imperial Kitchen. Mao could not believe that Fei was a bad guy and challenged him to a cooking battle that would be judged by the Emperor himself. Mao ended up winning the battle and found out that Fei was being manipulated by the Underground. After being healed by the Legendary Cooking Utensils, Fei revealed that he was drugged by the Dark Cooking Society, so he would turn evil and become one of their pawns in taking over China. When he found out that the organization that killed his parents and kidnapped him was the Dark Cooking Society, he wanted to seek revenge and infiltrated their headquarters. Unfortunately, that was when he was captured and drugged. Even though he was being manipulated, his actions were still bad. General Lee ordered Fei to protect Mao as he looks for the Legendary Cooking Utensils (not to make it obvious that he was being lenient to Fei). So, Fei ended up travelling with the rest of the group.

The legendary chef from Sichuan and Mao's deceased mother. She was the former Master Chef of Kikkaro Restaurant. Pai was called the 'Sichuan Fairy', or the 'Fairy of Cuisine', and was one of the most respected chefs in all of China. Even though she did not directly teach Mao her cooking techniques, she did teach him her ideals. She taught him how to use cooking to make people happy and healthy.
Pai was such a great chef that she was considered a threat to the Underground Cooking Society. In her early years as a chef, the Underground would always send chefs to battle her, which she always won. She even made a notebook compiling all the information she gained from battling chefs from the Dark Cooking Society, which would include the Dark Cooking Techniques that they used against her. Mao would eventually come to have possession of this book.
In the manga, it is revealed that she died from exhaustion. After her former pupil, Shao An, became a Super Chef, he stole all the chefs that were cooking in her restaurant, making her do all the work on her own. Though she died, her teachings would live on in her son, Mao.

Minor characters

The Vice Chef of Yang Spring Restaurant. Zhou Yu is known to be one of the best chefs in Guangzhou. He is usually the main chef in the restaurant since Ruoh rarely cooks anymore. He has strict rules for the chefs-in-training in the kitchen. Many say he has a steel heart and barely changes his expressions, but they still respect him greatly. Ruoh seems to be the only person that he listens to and is also the only person that can irritate him. He becomes Mao's Master and is also Mei's father. Even though he is very skilled in cooking, he is a bad fisherman. He tried to challenge Ruoh in fishing, but just ended up irritated by Ruoh's win.

The Master Chef of Yang Spring Restaurant. A skilled, experienced, and very well-respected Chef in Guangzhou. He may not seem like it at first glance, but he is an extremely well-built man with amazing power. He has the nickname of 'Superman Chef' in Guangzhou. He uses the Devil Cow Knife (which is used to chop cows' heads in one swing, and butcher it in another) to display his skill, 'The Skill of God', which uses his extreme strength (though, he no longer uses it too often due to his old age). Ruoh is often seen drinking alcohol. He is also Chouyu's Master and is one of the four Cooking Elders of Guangzhou.

Mao's first cooking rival. He used to be Pai's best apprentice until an accident left him scarred and unable to cook properly. After quitting, he turned rotten and returned to take over Kikkaro Restaurant. He ended up being the major contributor to Pai's death & even had the gall to take his anger out on her youngest offspring. Although after losing a cooking battle, judged by General Lee, against Mao, he was forced to permanently quit as a chef, which was the consequence of losing. Although he did not stay gone for too long, later showing up to challenge Mao once again, but this time as a chef for the Underground. After once again losing to Mao, he was prepared to sacrifice himself, along with everyone else, by blowing up the boat they were on. When he was about to fall to his death, Mao grabbed his arm and tried to save him. After a few words by Mao, Shao An understood his love for cooking and was able to let go of his hatred for Mao and Pai. Unfortunately, it was too late, and if Mao did not let go of Shao An's hand, Mao would fall with him. Having turned good again & feeling he should atone for all his terrible deeds, he saved Mao from falling with him by cutting his own hand off and falling to his death (In the anime, Shao An simply slipped from Mao's hand and fell to his death). Before he died, he also gave Mao the other half of Pai's book, which had detailed information on the Underground.

An Admiral for the Imperial Army of China. He is the Master Chef of the Emperor's Imperial Kitchen which makes him a highly skilled chef and basically the number one ranked chef in China. He is the one who sent Mao on his journey in becoming a Super Chef after seeing his natural talent and infinite potential. Lee often bumps into Mao during their journey and usually gives him other tasks, in the hopes of making Mao a great chef.

Mao's older sister. She works at the Kikkaro Restaurant as a waitress. When her mother died, she was the one left to take care of the restaurant.

Media

Manga
Chūka Ichiban!, written and illustrated by Etsushi Ogawa, was first serialized in Kodansha's Weekly Shōnen Magazine from October 11, 1995, to May 29, 1996. It was later moved to the publisher's Magazine Special, where it ran from July 5 to November 5, 1996. Kodansha collected its chapters in five tankōbon volumes, released from February 14, 1996, and December 11, 1996.

A follow-up sequel, was serialized in Weekly Shōnen Magazine from January 1, 1997, to May 19, 1999. Its chapters were collected in twelve tankōbon volumes, published between May 14, 1997, and June 15, 1999.

Ogawa started a sequel, titled , published in Kodansha's Magazine Pocket app since November 10, 2017. Kodansha has compiled its chapters into individual tankōbon volumes. The first volume was published on April 9, 2018. As of November 9, 2022, thirteen volumes have been published.

Anime

1997 series
An anime television series adaptation by Nippon Animation aired on Fuji TV from April 27, 1997, to September 13, 1998.

Episode list

2019 series
In 2019, it was announced that Shin Chūka Ichiban!, or True Cooking Master Boy manga would receive an anime television series adaptation produced by NAS, with animation by Production I.G. It is directed and written by Itsuro Kawasaki, with characters designs by Saki Hasegawa and music composed by Jun Ichikawa. The series aired from October 12 to December 28, 2019, on MBS's Animeism programming block.

After the final episode, it was announced that the series will be receiving a second season, with the staff and cast are reprising their roles. The second season aired from January 12 to March 30, 2021, on Tokyo MX, MBS, and BS-NTV.

China Film Animation licensed the series in Mainland China and Southeast Asia, and is streaming it on iQIYI.

Episode list

Season 1

Season 2

Anime theme songs

Chūka Ichiban!
Opening themes
  by Maki Ohguro (episodes 1–18)
  by Zard (episodes 19–36)
  by Deen (episodes 37–52)

Ending themes
  by Keiko Utoku (episodes 37–52)

Shin Chūka Ichiban!
Opening theme
 "Tough Heart" by Aika Kobayashi (season 2)

Ending theme
  by Brian the Sun (season 1)

See also
Dark cuisine or hei an liao li, a term coined from the series for bizarre food combinations
The God of Cookery (1996), a Stephen Chow cooking film
Yakitate!! Japan (2002 debut), a cooking manga and anime series
Food Wars!: Shokugeki no Soma (2012 debut), a cooking manga and anime series

Notes

References

External links
  
 

1997 anime television series debuts
2019 anime television series debuts
Animeism
Comics set in the Qing dynasty
Cooking in anime and manga
Crunchyroll anime
Fuji TV original programming
Japanese webcomics
Kodansha manga
Nippon Animation
Production I.G
Shōnen manga
Webcomics in print